Sadeqabad (also Romanized as Şādeqābād) is a village in Mobarakeh Rural District, in the Central District of Bafq County, Yazd Province, Iran. At the 2006 census, its population was 17, in 5 families.

References 

Populated places in Bafq County